Liu Zhi (Liu Chih in Wade–Giles) may refer to:

 Liu Zhi (prince) (劉祉), Eastern Han Dynasty prince
 Liu Zhi (Boxian) (劉植; died 26), style name Boxian (伯先), Eastern Han Dynasty general
 Emperor Huan of Han (132–168), name Liu Zhi (劉志), Eastern Han Dynasty emperor
 Liu Zhi (historian) (劉秩), style name Zuoqing (柞卿), Tang Dynasty historian
 Liu Yan (emperor) (889-942), emperor of Southern Han, also known as Liu Zhi
 Liu Zhi (poet) (劉植), style name Chengdao (成道), Song Dynasty poet
 Liu Zhi (scholar) (劉智; 1660–1739), style name Jielian (介廉), Qing Dynasty Hui Islamic scholar
 Liu Zhi (ROC) (劉峙; 1892–1971), Kuomintang military and political leader
 Liu Zhi (minister), CPC member and early minister of education